Azarin (masculine) or Azarina (feminine) is a Russian last name, a variant of Azarov.

People with the last name
Azary Azarin, Soviet actor who played Volgin in Chudak, a play by Alexander Afinogenov, and the brother of Rachel Messerer, Russian silent movie and theater actress
Iraj Azarin, one of the four signatories of the declaration founding the Worker-communist Party of Iran
Soussan Azarin, actor playing in the 2008 movie For a Moment, Freedom

Fictional characters
Anastas Azarin, Soviet interrogator from the 1958 American sci-fi novel Who?

See also
Azarino, a village in Prechistensky Rural Okrug of Pervomaysky District in Yaroslavl Oblast

References

Notes

Sources
Ю. А. Федосюк (Yu. A. Fedosyuk). "Русские фамилии: популярный этимологический словарь" (Russian Last Names: a Popular Etymological Dictionary). Москва, 2006. 



Russian-language surnames